Bharateswari Homes is a boarding school for girls located in Mirzapur, Tangail District, Bangladesh. The school was established in 1945 by philanthropist Ranadaprasad Saha. He established the institution for the girls education and named it after his grandmother Bharateswari Devi.

Bharateswari Homes the girls school is the first residential development in the region. The school introduced Higher Secondary Examination in 1962. But the HSC section closed in 1973, and reopened in 1983. In 2013, the school had approximately 1000 students and 60 teachers.

Apart from regular studies, students at the school take an active part in cultural activities, particularly in physical training. The school is nationally renowned for its unique physical training offered to its students. Each year students are invited by the government to perform in the holiday celebrations and important national festivals in Dhaka.

The school provides education and training in computer literacy and also runs an English Language Club, a Science Club, a Debating Club and a unit of the Bishwo Shahitto Kendro. In 1997, Bharateswari Homes had formed Girls-in-Scout, which is the largest children's organization in the country.

Notable alumni
 Aruna Biswas, television and film actress

Awards
 Independence Day Award – 2020

References 

Schools in Tangail District
Educational institutions established in 1945
Recipients of the Independence Day Award
1945 establishments in India